Events from the year 1515 in India.

Events
 Phyang Monastery established in Leh district.
 Afonso de Albuquerque dies and so ceases his governorship of Portuguese India (commenced 1509)
 Lopo Soares de Albergaria becomes governor of Portuguese India (and continues until 1518)

Births

Deaths

 16 December - Afonso de Albuquerque

See also

 Timeline of Indian history

References